The Tower Theatre, built in 1938, is a Sacramento, California landmark and the oldest remaining, continuously running picture palace.

The theater was designed by California theater architect William B. David in the Streamline Moderne style of architecture.  The original owner was Joseph Blumenfeld, a second generation theatre owner. At the time, there was only one movie screen.  The first movie shown was Algiers.  The theatre was renovated in 1972 and divided into a three screen cinema.

They were bought by the Reading International theater chain in 1998, who, upgraded the theater in 2012 with digital projectors. In 2016, it was sold to an endowment fund as a long-term investment.

See also
Alhambra Theatre (Sacramento)
Crest Theatre

References

Cinemas and movie theaters in California
Buildings and structures in Sacramento, California
1938 establishments in California